The 2011 Curlers Corner Autumn Gold Curling Classic was held from October 7 to 10 at the Calgary Curling Club in Calgary, Alberta. It was the first women's Grand Slam event of the 2011–12 curling season and the twenty-sixth time the tournament has been held. The purse for the event was CAD$54,000, and the winning team of Cathy Overton-Clapham of Manitoba, received CAD$14,000. Overton-Clapham defeated Alberta's Amy Nixon, who skipped for Shannon Kleibrink, in the final.

Teams

Knockout brackets

A event

B event

C event

Knockout results

Draw 1
October 7, 9:30 AM MT

Draw 2
October 7, 1:15 PM MT

Draw 3
October 7, 5:15 PM MT

Draw 4
October 7, 9:00 PM MT

Draw 5
October 8, 9:00 AM MT

Draw 6
October 8, 12:45 PM MT

Draw 7
October 8, 4:30 PM MT

Draw 8
October 8, 8:15 PM MT

Draw 9
October 9, 9:00 AM MT

Draw 10
October 9, 12:45 PM MT

Draw 11
October 9, 4:30 PM MT

Draw 12
October 9, 8:15 PM MT

Playoffs

Quarterfinals
October 10, 9:00 AM MT

Semifinals
October 10, 1:00 PM MT

Final
October 10, 4:00 PM MT

Notes

External links
Event Home Page

Autumn Gold Curling Classic
2011 in Canadian curling
Curlers Corner Autumn Gold Curling Classic
2011 in women's curling